Pointe-Sapin is a settlement on the northern coast of New Brunswick, Canada, on the Northumberland Strait in the Gulf of the St. Lawrence. As a designated place in the 2011 Census, it had a population of 350 living in 165 of its 192 total private dwellings. Pointe-Sapin lies in the Atlantic Time Zone (AST/ADT) and observes daylight saving time.

History

Notable people

See also
List of communities in New Brunswick

References

Communities in Kent County, New Brunswick
Designated places in New Brunswick
Local service districts of Kent County, New Brunswick